Otto, Lord of Lippe ( – ) was the ruling Count of Lippe-Lemgo from 1344 until his death.

Life 
He was the son of Simon I and his wife, Adelaide of Waldeck.

When his father died in 1344, Lippe was divided; Otto ruled the area around Lemgo, while his brother Bernard V ruled the area around Rheda.

Otto resided in Lemgo, which at the time consisted of two legally separate town: the Old Town and the New Town.  In 1365, five years after  Otto's death, these were amalgamated to form the Town of Lemgo.

Marriage and issue 
Otto was married to Irmgard of the Marck, daughter of Engelbert II of the Mark. They had three children:
 Simon III
 Margaret
 Adelaide

Lords of Lippe
1300 births
1360 deaths
Year of birth uncertain
Year of death uncertain
14th-century German nobility